Christian Hansen (born 26 May 1976) is a Danish curler.

At the national level, he is a 2003 Danish men's champion.

Teams

References

External links

Living people
1976 births

Danish male curlers
Danish curling champions